Geochorda is a monotypic genus of flowering plants belonging to the family Plantaginaceae. The only species is Geochorda glechomoides.

Its native range is Southern Brazil to Northeastern Argentina.

References

Plantaginaceae
Plantaginaceae genera
Monotypic Lamiales genera